Peter Webber (born 1968) is a British film and television director and producer whose debut feature film as a director was Girl with a Pearl Earring (2003). He subsequently directed Hannibal Rising (2007).

Early life
Webber took a one-year Postgraduate Film and TV course at the University of Bristol.

Career

Films 
Girl with a Pearl Earring, starring Scarlett Johansson and Colin Firth, marked Webber's feature film debut. The film has received numerous accolades, including three Academy Award nominations, two Golden Globe nominations, and 10 BAFTA Award nominations.

Dino De Laurentiis tapped Webber to direct Hannibal Rising.  Based on Thomas Harris' book of the same name, and starring Gaspard Ulliel, Gong Li and Rhys Ifans, this prequel depicts a young Hannibal Lecter as he gradually becomes a serial killer.

Webber made his first short film, The Zebra Man, about sideshow performer Horace Ridler starring Minnie Driver.

Then, in 2012, Webber returned to the big screen with the World War II drama Emperor, starring Tommy Lee Jones.

Television
He directed Simon Russell Beale as Franz Schubert in The Temptation of Franz Schubert and explored the counter-culture of tunnel-dwelling road protesters in Underground. His 2001 Channel 4 miniseries Men Only stirred controversy for its frank and shocking portrayal of the dark side of male sexuality. It is notable for giving early leads to Stephen Moyer of True Blood and Martin Freeman of The Hobbit.

In 2016, he directed the ITV miniseries Tutankhamun, starring Sam Neill.

Documentary
An award-winning documentary director, Webber directed several programmes for Channel 4 about classical music including child prodigies, maestros and composers such as Richard Wagner.  He also directed several popular science documentaries about a range of subjects including crash test dummies, deep sea life and phantom limbs.

In 2009, he travelled into the remote Colombian Amazon to film with the Macuna Tribe for a documentary called The Sand and the Rain.

Producer
Webber moved to Qatar in 2008 where he took up the post of Creative Director at Qatar National Day for two years. During this time he developed their film programme. While in Qatar he also executive produced several documentary films including Sarajevo Film Festival winner For the Love of Books, which was also the recipient of a Grierson Award in 2012 for Best Historical Documentary.

Filmography

Films
 The Stretford Wives (2001)
 Girl with a Pearl Earring (2003)
 Hannibal Rising (2007)
 Emperor (2012)
 Earth: One Amazing Day (2017)
Pickpockets: maestros del robo (2018)
 Inna de Yard: The Soul of Jamaica (2019)

Television
 The Temptation of Franz Schubert (1997)
 Underground (1999)
 Men Only (2001)
 Six Feet Under (2004, TV episode "The Dare")
 Tutankhamun (2016)
 Kingdoms of Fire (2019)

References

External links

1968 births
Alumni of the University of Bristol
British film directors
British television directors
Living people